Harperville is a census-designated place and unincorporated community in rural Scott County, Mississippi, United States. Harperville has a post office with ZIP code 39080.

It was first named as a CDP in the 2020 Census which listed a population of 250.

History
Harperville was named for G. W. Harper, an early European-American settler.

In October 1898, a white mob retaliated for African Americans resisting arrest. The county sheriff gathered a posse, and the governor asked for National Guard support. Governor Anselm J. McLaurin went by train to Forest to assess the situation. After arresting several blacks, the sheriff took them to the county seat at Forest for their safety. The New Orleans Picayune reported that 11 blacks and one white had been killed."

Demographics

2020 census

Note: the US Census treats Hispanic/Latino as an ethnic category. This table excludes Latinos from the racial categories and assigns them to a separate category. Hispanics/Latinos can be of any race.

Education
It is in the Scott County School District.

References

Unincorporated communities in Scott County, Mississippi
Unincorporated communities in Mississippi
Census-designated places in Scott County, Mississippi